The 2001 FC Anzhi Makhachkala season was the 2nd season that the club played in the Russian Top Division, the highest tier of football in Russia, following their promotion from the National Football League in 1999. They finished the season in 13th, were runners-up in the 2001–02 cup and reached the Sixth Round of the 2002–03 cup losing to Dynamo Moscow, and were knocked out of the UEFA Cup at the First Round stage after a 0–1 defeat to Rangers over one leg in Warsaw, Poland.

Season Events
After Gadzhi Gadzhiyev left the club during the summer, Aleksandr Markarov was appointed as an interim manager until a permanent manager could be found.

On 19 August 2001, during the game against CSKA Moscow, Serhiy Perkhun collided head-to-head with Anzhi forward Budun Budunov who also sustained serious head trauma during the collision.  At first, the injury appeared to be minor. Perkhun was substituted for and diagnosed with a broken nose. However he became suddenly comatose on the way to the airport and died nine days later from a brain hemorrhage.

On 27 September, Anzhi faced Rangers in the First Round of the UEFA Cup, with the match being switched to a single-legged tie and moved to neutral Warsaw from Dagestan due to increased fighting in neighbouring Chechnya.

Squad

Transfers

In

Loans in

Out

Released

Competitions

Overview

Top Division

League table

Results summary

Results

Russian Cup

2000-01

Final

2001-02

UEFA Cup

Squad statistics

Appearances and goals

|-
|colspan="14"|Players who appeared for Anzhi Makhachkala but left during the season:

|}

Goal scorers

Clean sheets

Disciplinary record

Notes
The UEFA Cup First Round tie between Anzhi Makhachkala and Rangers was played over One-Leg at a neutral venue due security concerns regarding the ongoing Chechen War in the neighboring area.

References

External links
Squad List

2001
Anzhi Makhachkala